Akwasi Owusu Afrifa-Mensa (born 4 March 1971) is a Ghanaian politician who is a member of the New Patriotic Party. He is the member of parliament for the Amasaman Constituency in the Greater Accra Region of Ghana

Early life and education 
Akwasi Owusu was born in Asaam in the Ashanti Region. He Holds Master of Business Administration ( Finance)

Personal life 
Owusu is a Christian

References 

Living people
1971 births
New Patriotic Party politicians
Ghanaian MPs 2021–2025